The Girl with the Hungry Eyes is a 1995 American horror film starring Christina Fulton, Leon Herbert, Jon Jacobs and Isaac Turner. Loosely based on Fritz Leiber's 1949 story of the same name, about a pinup girl as a psychic vampire, it was written and directed by Jacobs.

Plot
A fashion model in the 1930s, who owns an Art Deco Miami hotel, kills herself when her fiancé is unfaithful to her.  Sixty years later she returns to life as a vampire.

References

External links

1995 horror films
1995 films
American horror films
1990s English-language films
1990s American films